Scream is a compilation album by American singer-songwriter Michael Jackson, released on September 29, 2017. The album compiles songs around a Halloween theme. It is the eleventh release by Sony and/or Motown since Jackson's death on June 25, 2009.

Background
A 17-second teaser was released on Michael Jackson's official Facebook page and YouTube Vevo page on September 6, 2017, just after a 3D version of the 1983 "Thriller" short film premiered in Venice, Italy. Later that day, the album was classified as a "Halloween album" with mysterious theme songs. The track "Blood on the Dance Floor x Dangerous (The White Panda Mash-up)" became available for purchase in digital format. Another track, "Thriller (Steve Aoki Midnight Hour Remix)" was also released digitally on September 29. However, this remix was not included on the album.

Critical reception
The album received mixed reviews with most reviews criticizing the album's tracklist. Joel Garcia from Evo News highlighted the fact that a few songs actually are Halloween-related, while other songs ("Leave Me Alone", "Scream", "Unbreakable", among others) have little to nothing to do with the theme of the album: "[The rest of the songs] are instead about either failed relationships or Jackson’s thoughts on the media." On a similar note, Dan Weiss from Consequence of Sound questioned the inclusion of said songs, but he praised the inclusion of lesser-known tracks (including "Somebody's Watching Me").

Commercial performance
It debuted at number 28 in France, selling 3,300 units. In the United States, it debuted with 14,000 units, including 11,000 from pure album sales, in its first week of release, charting at number 33 on the Billboard 200.

Track listing

 Track 14 contains vocals and musical elements from "Blood on the Dance Floor", "Dangerous", "This Place Hotel", "Is It Scary" and "Leave Me Alone".

Charts

Weekly

Year-end

References

2017 compilation albums
Epic Records compilation albums
Halloween albums
Michael Jackson compilation albums
Compilation albums published posthumously